Unfinished Picture is an album by Rupert Hine.  It was originally released in 1973, by Purple Records, and re-released on CD in 1988 by Line Records. It was recorded at the Church of Saint Mary Magdalene, Paddington, London.

Music from the album was featured in the Anthony Stern film Wheel.

The album features contributions from Steve Nye and Simon Jeffes of Penguin Cafe Orchestra.

Track listing 
All music composed by Rupert Hine, all lyrics composed by David McIver; except where indicated
"Orange Song" (music by Hine, Simon Jeffes)
"Doubtfully Grey"
"Don't Be Alarmed"
"Where in my Life"
"Anvils in Five"
"Friends and Lovers'
"Move Along"
"Concord(e) Pastich(e)" (music by Hine, Simon Jeffes)
"On The Waterline"

Personnel 
Rupert Hine - guitar, keyboards, vocals
Simon Jeffes - guitar, bass
John Perry - bass
Steve Nye - piano
Mick Waller - drums
Mike Giles - drums
John Punter - drums
Ray Cooper - percussion
Dave Cass - trumpet
John Mumford - trombone
The Martyn Ford Ensemble - strings

1973 albums
Rupert Hine albums
Albums produced by Rupert Hine
Purple Records albums